Phacophallus is a genus of beetles belonging to the family Staphylinidae.

The genus has almost cosmopolitan distribution.

Species:
 Phacophallus afrus Bordoni, 2016 
 Phacophallus arabicus Coiffait, 1979

References

Staphylinidae
Staphylinidae genera